Zadniki is a settlement west of Sveti Gregor in the Municipality of Ribnica in southern Slovenia. It includes three hamlets: Zadniki, Mlake, and Avžlah. The area is part of the traditional region of Lower Carniola and is now included in the Southeast Slovenia Statistical Region.

References

External links
Zadniki on Geopedia

Populated places in the Municipality of Ribnica